Tłokowo  is a village in the administrative district of Gmina Jeziorany, within Olsztyn County, Warmian-Masurian Voivodeship, in northern Poland.

The village has a population of 610.

Notable residents
 Andreas Thiel (1826–1908), Bishop

References

Villages in Olsztyn County